Chocz  is a town in Pleszew County, Greater Poland Voivodeship, in west-central Poland. It is the seat of the gmina (administrative district) called Gmina Chocz. As of December 2021, the town has a population of 1,746.

Chocz regained town rights on January 1, 2015.

Demographics
Detailed data as of 31 December 2021:

Number of inhabitants by year

References

Chocz